Tommy Walsh (born 26 February 1988) is an Irish sportsman who has played at the top level of Gaelic football and Australian rules football. The son of former Kerry Gaelic footballer Seán Walsh, he has played Gaelic football for the Kerins O'Rahilly's club and at senior level for the Kerry county team.

Gaelic football

Minor and under-21
It was clear from an early stage that Walsh was a talented footballer. He was a star player for the Kerry team which reached the All-Ireland Minor Football Championship final in 2006. He made his debut for the Kerry seniors in the 2007 National Football League, coming on as a substitute wing-forward on 11 March against Limerick. Kerry went on to win the 2007 All-Ireland Senior Football Championship although Walsh did not appear in any championship game.

In 2008, Walsh won the All-Ireland Under-21 Football Championship with Kerry.

Kerry
Walsh was part of the Kerry panel who won the 2007 All-Ireland Senior Football Championship.

In 2008, Walsh was selected in the team for the first game of the All-Ireland Senior Football Championship following some impressive NFL performances in the full-forward line.  Walsh made his championship debut came against Clare in the Munster Senior Football Championship, scoring a point.  He did not start in the Munster final, which Kerry lost to Cork, but came on as a substitute for the last few minutes.
He regained his place and a number of impressive performances saw him named as All Stars Young Footballer of the Year.

Later in the year, having resisted previous approaches from the Australian Football League, Walsh agreed to spend one week of preseason training with Australian Rules Football club, St Kilda. Players' agent Ricky Nixon described it as a 'big coup' for the AFL and said '"I can’t tell you if he'll want to play or stay or if he’ll be good enough but he’s definitely one of the best talents that I’ve seen."  However, Walsh later withdrew from the original trial and did not travel to Australia before the recruitment deadline, although he accepted an invitation to spend some time training with St Kilda.

  
In 2009, Walsh suffered injury in the early part of the championship, which saw Kerry knocked out of Munster by Cork. Kerry came through the qualifiers to meet Dublin in the All-Ireland quarter-final, but Walsh was not on top form and was replaced before half-time. He was dropped from the team but came on as a substitute during the second half of the semi-final, and a more impressive performance saw him regain his place for the final. In the 2009 All-Ireland Senior Football Championship Final, in which Kerry overcame Cork, Walsh notched up four points from play (two with each foot).

Australian rules football

St Kilda
In October 2009, Walsh finally agreed to sign a two year AFL contract in 2009, with St Kilda general manager Matthew Drain saying that "he has enormous talent to become an important player for St Kilda".

In October 2010, Walsh returned to Ireland to line out for the Irish international rules team in the 2010 International Rules Series, held at the Gaelic Grounds in Limerick. Ireland lost the first test of 2010.

Sydney Swans
In October 2011, Walsh requested and received a trade to the Sydney Swans and was selected for Ireland for the 2011 International Rules Series against Australia.

Walsh was given the number 17 guernsey, vacated by the retirement of Tadhg Kennelly, who was a team-mate of Walsh's at Kerry in 2009. Walsh made his senior debut on Saturday 19 May 2012 against , kicking two goals as the Swans won by 101 points.

In 2013, he tore three hamstring tendons from a bone.

At the conclusion of the 2014 AFL season, Walsh informed Sydney that he would return to Ireland.

Return to the Kerry team
Kerry recalled Walsh for the 2015 National Football League. He played in six of Kerry's games in the Springs. He played his first Munster championship game since the 2009 when he came on as a sub in the semi-final win over Tipperary. He later lined out in the All-Ireland quarter-final win over Kildare. He played in four of Kerry's 2016 National Football League campaign, but left the panel before the start of the championship. Selector Mikey Sheehy later admitted this was a mistake, saying "we kind of threw him in at the deep end".

In September 2018, veteran Kerry forward Kieran Donaghy retired. The same week Walsh scored 2–2 in a county championship meeting with Dr Crokes. In October 2018, Walsh told an interviewer: "I think it's unlikely that I'll play for Kerry again".

Peter Keane took over as Kerry manager in late 2018. He phoned Walsh. Walsh helped Kerry reach the 2019 All-Ireland Senior Football Championship Final. A substitute against Dublin, the drawn game was the first time in a decade that he played in the decider. Almost as soon as he came on, Walsh set up a vital Kerry goal for Killian Spillane.

References

External links

1988 births
Living people
All Stars Young Footballers of the Year
Gaelic footballers who switched code
Gaelic football forwards
Irish players of Australian rules football
Kerry inter-county Gaelic footballers
Kerins O'Rahilly's Gaelic footballers
People from Tralee
Sydney Swans players
Tommy
Winners of one All-Ireland medal (Gaelic football)
Sportspeople from County Kerry
Irish expatriate sportspeople in Australia